Robert Michael Mischak (October 25, 1932 – June 26, 2014) was a college and professional American football guard and tight end who played six seasons in the American Football League (AFL), from  1960 to 1965.  He was selected by his peers as a Sporting News AFL All-League guard in 1960 and 1961.  He was an AFL Eastern Division All-Star in 1962.  He also played in the National Football League (NFL) for the New York Giants and was a starting guard in the famed 1958 "Greatest Game Ever Played". In addition, Mischak was a 3-time Super Bowl champion coach with the Oakland/Los Angeles Raiders.

In an October 1953 game against Duke at the Polo Grounds in New York City, Mischak made an improbable play to seal a 14–13 Army victory that was chronicled in David Maraniss' biography of Vince Lombardi, When Pride Still Mattered.  Late in the fourth quarter, Duke running back Red Smith ran a double reverse for what would have been a go-ahead touchdown, but was pursued by Mischak from 73 yards behind.  As Smith neared the endzone, Mischak caught up to him and made a touchdown-saving tackle short of the goal line.  Two subsequent stops by the Army defense yielded a historic victory for head coach Red Blaik. Col Blaik was later to write “In somehow catching and collaring (Smith), Mischak displayed heart and a pursuit that for one single play I have never seen matched."

In 2017, Mischak was posthumously enshrined into the Army/West Point Sports Hall of Fame, and was named no. 7 on NFL.com's list of Top Ten All Time NFL Players from service academies.

After his playing career Mischak served as a coach of tight ends for the Oakland/Los Angeles Raiders from 1973 to 1987 and 1994. He died on June 26, 2014 at the age of 81.

See also
 List of American Football League players

References

1932 births
2014 deaths
American Football League All-League players
American Football League All-Star players
American Football League players
American football offensive guards
Army Black Knights football coaches
Army Black Knights football players
Los Angeles Raiders coaches
London Monarchs coaches
New York Giants players
New York Titans (AFL) players
Oakland Raiders coaches
Oakland Raiders players
People from Union Township, Union County, New Jersey
Players of American football from Newark, New Jersey
Sportspeople from Newark, New Jersey
Arena Football League coaches
Washington Commandos coaches
Military personnel from New Jersey